Ian Bremner (born 11 April 1947) is a former Australian rules footballer who represented  and  in the Victorian Football League (VFL) during the 1960s and 1970s.

A half back flanker recruited from Pearcedale, Bremner started his career at Collingwood in 1966 but after playing just one game in the season he crossed to Hawthorn. He was a premiership player in 1971, losing grand finalist in 1975 and a premiership player again in 1976.

Bremner moved to Tasmania and had a stint coaching North Hobart in the TANFL for the 1977 and 1978 seasons.

Honours and achievements 
Hawthorn
 2× VFL premiership player: 1971, 1976
 2× Minor premiership: 1971, 1975

Individual
 Hawthorn life member

External links

1947 births
Living people
Australian people of Scottish descent
Collingwood Football Club players
Hawthorn Football Club players
Hawthorn Football Club Premiership players
North Hobart Football Club coaches
Glenorchy Football Club players
North Hobart Football Club players
Australian rules footballers from Victoria (Australia)
Two-time VFL/AFL Premiership players